Stolen Moments: Red Hot + Cool is a compilation album in the Red Hot AIDS Benefit Series with performers from jazz, pop, rock, and rap. "Stolen Moments" is a jazz standard composed by Oliver Nelson, and is best known for its inclusion on the 1961 album The Blues and the Abstract Truth.

Background
This album was one of the first to examine the impact of AIDS in the African American community. The release included liner notes by Professor Cornel West. An accompanying documentary film was broadcast on PBS.

Reception

Time magazine named it Album of the Year in 1994, calling it "a landmark album that brilliantly harnesses the fire of rap and the cool of jazz, transcending genres and generations." Anderson Jones of Entertainment Weekly awarded the album an "A", describing it as "a flawless, head-bobbing collection," while the Los Angeles Times'''s Bill Kohlhaase wrote: "for jazz fans looking for something new, it's a fine introduction to the rhythms of the street." Writing for AllMusic, Joshua David Shanker called the recording "undoubtedly the most successful incarnation of the Red Hot albums... an abridged lexicon of the evolutions in black music during the post-bop era... a history piece." Chris M. Slawecki of All About Jazz'' described it as "a multihued explosion of genres, an oft mind-blowing marriage of nearly thirty of the hardest-blowin' and sheer funkiest artists from the parallel spheres of jazz and hip-hop."

Track listing

Disc one
 "Time Is Moving On" – Donald Byrd, Guru, Ronny Jordan – 2:58
 "Un Ange En Danger" – Ron Carter, MC Solaar – 3:49
 "Positive" – Michael Franti, Spearhead – 4:29
 "Nocturnal Sunshine" – Herbie Hancock, Meshell Ndegeocello – 6:04
 "Flyin' High in the Brooklyn Sky" – Lester Bowie, Digable Planets, Wah Wah Watson – 6:33
 "Stolen Moments" – United Future Organization – 5:23
 "The Rubbers Song" – The Pharcyde – 4:08
 "Proceed II" – Roy Ayers, The Roots – 5:52
 "Trouble Don't Last Always" – Carleen Anderson, Incognito, Ramsey Lewis – 6:38
 "Rent Strike 9" – Groove Collective, Bernie Worrell – 5:27
 "The Scream" – Joshua Redman, Tony Rémy, Us3 – 6:01
 "This Is Madness" – Umar Bin Hassan, Abiodun Oyewole, Pharoah Sanders – 6:01
 "Apprehension" – Don Cherry, The Watts Prophets – 4:39

Disc two
 "A Love Supreme" – Branford Marsalis – 18:08
 "A Love Supreme" – Alice Coltrane – 7:02
 "The Creator Has a Master Plan" – Pharoah Sanders – 5:02

See also
Red Hot Organization

References

Red Hot Organization albums
1994 compilation albums
Jazz compilation albums
GRP Records albums